The women's 4 × 400 metres relay at the 1971 Pan American Games was held in Cali on 5 August. It was the first time that the event was held at the Games.

Results

References

Athletics at the 1971 Pan American Games
1971